Lucy McKenzie (born 1977) is a British artist based in Brussels.

Biography
Born in Glasgow, Scotland, McKenzie studied for her BA at Duncan of Jordanstone College of Art and Design in Dundee from 1995–1999 and at Karlsruhe Kunstakademie in Germany in 1998.

McKenzie first came to prominence when she won the EAST award at EASTinternational in 1999 which was selected by Peter Doig and Roy Arden. She has since shown work in many exhibitions, such as “The Dictatorship of the Viewer” at the Venice Biennale, Becks Futures 2000 in London, Manchester and Glasgow and “Happy Outsiders” at Zacheta Gallery in Warsaw. She has exhibited internationally at galleries and museums including Tate Britain in London, Kunsthalle Basel in Switzerland and the Walker Art Center in Minneapolis.

In 2013 McKenzie exhibited at Tate Britain in 'Painting Now: Five Contemporary Artists'.

The Art Institute of Chicago featured McKenzie in 2014 in an exhibition entitled focus: Lucy McKenzie.

The seventh season of The Artist's Institute at Hunter College, New York was dedicated to Lucy McKenzie, September 20, 2013 – February 2, 2014, describing her as an artist who "makes works drawn from the artistic lieu of the cities and social circles she inhabits. Early paintings appropriated the language of 1970s Scottish murals, while more recent projects have reconstructed archetypal domestic interiors by employing faux finishing techniques. McKenzie has also founded a record label, a bar, a fashion line, and is currently experimenting with the field of crime fiction."

She was a guest professor at the Kunstakademie Düsseldorf 2011-2013.

Exhibitions
 "Projects 88: Lucy McKenzie" Museum of Modern Art, New York, September 10-December 1, 2008
 "Lucy McKenzie" Museum Ludwig, Cologne, Germany, March 14-July 25, 2009

Publications
 Neil Mulholland, "Dreams of a Provincial Girl," PARKETT 76, 2006
 Isabelle Graw, "On the Road to Retreat: An Interview with Lucy McKenzie," PARKETT 76, 2006
 Bennett Simpson, "Lucy McKenzie, Herself," PARKETT 76, 2006

References

External links
Lucy McKenzie at Galerie Buchholz
Lucy McKenzie – Saatchi Gallery
Lucy McKenzie on ArtFacts.net

1977 births
Living people
21st-century British women artists
Alumni of the University of Dundee
Artists from Glasgow
People from Milton of Campsie
Scottish expatriates in Belgium
Scottish contemporary artists
Scottish women artists
Scottish women painters